Wiehle is a surname. Notable people with the surname include:

 Ernst Wiehle (1894–?), German World War I flying ace
 Hermann Wiehle (1884–1966), German teacher and arachnologist
 Martin Wiehle (born 1926), German historian
 Wolfgang Wiehle (born 1964), German politician

See also
 Wiehler